Francine Tint is a New York City based American abstract expressionist painter.

Career

Art 

Tint studied at the Pratt Institute and the Brooklyn Museum College.

Tint began showing her work in various galleries in the 1970s. Her early paintings are gestural and lyrical, with many circlings, loopings, and expressionistic brushstrokes. In her later work, the color takes on more of a force, more taut and with more surface tension. Her work has been exhibited in nearly thirty solo shows and nearly fifty group shows in the United States and Europe. Tint is also in the permanent collection of numerous museums including the Clement Greenberg collection at the Portland Art Museum as well as the Krannert Art Museum in Champaign, Illinois. and most recently, the Neuberger Museum of Art in New York. Her work is in many private and corporate collections including Pepsi Co. and Mount Sinai Hospital. Her works are exhibited by Cavalier Galleries and Denise Bibro Fine Art, Inc. New York City.  Francine Tint's 2018 exhibition at Cavalier Galleries recently appeared in the print edition of D'Art International. Tint lists painters Antoni Tàpies, Larry Poons, Hans Hofmann, Jules Olitski, and Helen Frankenthaler as her primary influences.

Costume design 
Tint also worked for many years as a television and film costume designer, working on projects for ESPN, David Bowie, and Ridley Scott, among others.  Tint has said that her work in costume design has influenced her painting as her canvases share the attribute of having many layers to them as with the application of fabrics by fashion designers into their creations.

References

External links 
 

American abstract artists
Living people
1943 births